The 82nd (Airborne and Amphibious) Division is a division of the Nigerian Army. It has an area of responsibility covering Southern Nigeria, near the borders with Cameroon. It is numbered in honor of the 82nd (West Africa) Division during the Burma campaign.

History 
It was established in 1975. General Mamman Jiya Vatsa established the doctrinal basis for the establishment of the 82nd Division, including its naming after the 82nd West African Division.

Structure 
The division included:

 Headquarters (Enugu)
 7 Amphibious Battalion
 93 Amphibious Battalion (Takum)
 146 Amphibious Battalion
 245 Reconnaissance Battalion
 2 Amphibious Brigade (Port Harcourt)
 1 Amphibious Battalion
 20 Amphibious Battalion
 40 Motorized Battalion
 13 Motorized Brigade (Calabar)
 4 Motorized Battalion
 103 Amphibious Battalion (Garikki)
 34 Field Artillery Brigade (Obinze)
 341 Field Artillery Regiment
 342 Field Artillery Regiment
 343 Field Artillery Regiment

Commanders 

 Zamani Lekwot (?)
 Oladipo Diya (1985-1991)
 Major General Felix Mujakperuo (1996-1998)

References 

Military units and formations of Nigeria
Military in Africa
Nigerian Army